Mahia Nagib was a journalist and editor in Aden, Yemen. She founded Fatat Shamsan [The Maiden of Mount Shamsan] in 1960, making her Aden's first female editor of a women's monthly magazine.

In the 1950s, Nagib edited the women's column of the weekly newspaper al-Nahda. When she founded Fatat Shamsan, it was the first women's journal in the Arabian Peninsula. Her opening editorial emphasised the importance of women's journalism in pressing for women's rights:

References

Year of birth missing
Year of death missing
Yemeni educators
Yemeni women journalists
Founders of educational institutions
Women educators
20th-century Yemeni women
20th-century Yemeni people